Donata Karalienė (born 11 June 1989) is a Lithuanian rower and Olympic bronze medalist at the Rio 2016 Games. She is also known for winning gold medals at the 2013 World Rowing Championships, and the 2012 and 2013 European Rowing Championships.

Career 
Karaliene, competing under her maiden name Vištartaitė, had a successful junior career, finishing 6th at her first Junior World Championships in 2006, and following that by winning a bronze medal at the 2007 World Junior Championships and gold at the 2010 and 2011 Under 23 World Championships.

Karaliene won the women's single sculls at the 2012 European Championships, having won bronze the year before.

Switching to the double sculls, Karaliene teamed up with Milda Valčiukaitė.  The pair went unbeaten in their first season, winning the 2013 World Championships and the 2013 European Championships.  Following this, the team narrowly missed out on a medal at the 2014 World Championships, but won the silver medal at the 2014 and 2015 European Championships.

At the 2016 Summer Olympics, Karaliene and Valčiukaitė won the bronze medal in the women's double sculls, Lithuania's first women's rowing medal since 2000.

Biography
Karaliene was originally a track athlete, competing in the middle distance events.  When her coach stopped coaching, she continued without support.  A rowing coach visited her home town looking for talented athletes with the potential to become rowers.  He convinced her to take up rowing.  She was very successful, winning the Lithuanian junior championships after only one year of rowing training.  Because of this success, she was invited to attend a sports boarding school in Kaunas.

Studying in Lithuanian Academy of Physical Education. She lives in Kaunas.

References

Lithuanian female rowers
1989 births
Living people
Rowers at the 2012 Summer Olympics
Rowers at the 2016 Summer Olympics
Rowers at the 2020 Summer Olympics
Olympic rowers of Lithuania
Lithuanian Sportsperson of the Year winners
World Rowing Championships medalists for Lithuania
Olympic bronze medalists for Lithuania
Olympic medalists in rowing
Medalists at the 2016 Summer Olympics
Universiade gold medalists for Lithuania
Universiade medalists in rowing
European Rowing Championships medalists
Medalists at the 2013 Summer Universiade
Medalists at the 2015 Summer Universiade